Basti Mian Ahmed Deen is a village in Tehsil Ahmed Pur Sial District, Jhang, Punjab, Pakistan. It is named after a person who served for the village, Mian Ahmed Deen Bhatti. Its population is about 1,000. The people of Basti Mian Ahmed Deen are very religious minded. Mian Faiz Ahmad Bhatti is also a successor to Mian Ahmed Deen Bhatti. Mian Faiz Ahmed Bhatti is a known good politician in that area.

Villages in Jhang District